is a Japanese manga artist. He made his debut in Young Jump with Kakumei Route 163 in 1982.

He is best known for his series Yoiko and Fighting Beauty Wulong.

Selected works

External links
 Yūgo Ishikawa's Home Page  
 

1960 births
Living people
Manga artists from Osaka Prefecture
People from Shijōnawate